Star Search Croatia Season 2 is the second season of the second Croatian version of Pop Idol, broadcast in 2010.

Auditions were held in the four biggest cities of the country: Zagreb, Rijeka, Osijek and Split. Tony Cetinski and Goran Lisica returned as judges while Jelena Radan was replaced by Anđa Marić during the auditions.

Finals elimination chart

Note: "Bottom two" consists of two contestants: one who received the fewest votes and one who is randomly picked by not being called as the qualifier before the other contestants.

References

External links
 Official website

2010 Croatian television seasons